Herbert S. Denenberg (November 20, 1929March 18, 2010) was an American television journalist, lawyer, consumer advocate, and insurance regulator. He is best remembered by audiences in the Philadelphia television market as a long time consumer affairs reporter on WCAU (Channel 10).

Biography
Born into a Jewish family in Omaha, Nebraska, the son of a Russian-born father and a Romanian-born mother, Denenberg's father died of a heart attack when he was twelve, leaving him to help raise his seven siblings. He had an extensive educations, earning his B.S. at Johns Hopkins University, J.D. at Creighton University School of Law, LL.M. at Harvard Law School, and Ph.D at the University of Pennsylvania. He was both a Chartered Property Casualty Underwriter and a Chartered Life Underwriter. He served three years in the Judge Advocate General's Corps, United States Army as a first lieutenant and as a captain in the reserve.

In his academic career, Denenberg was an assistant professor of insurance at the University of Iowa, professor of law at Temple University, adjunct professor at Cabrini College, and Loman Professor at the Wharton School of the University of Pennsylvania. He sat on the board of the Consumers Union, publishers of Consumer Reports, and was a consultant and counsel to numerous agencies of the federal government as well as state and local governments. He co-authored the first no-fault insurance law in the United States, passed in Puerto Rico, and was involved in revising insurance laws in Nevada and Alaska.  In 1971, he was appointed Commissioner of the Pennsylvania Department of Insurance in the cabinet of Governor Milton Shapp. In 1974, he ran for the Democratic Party nomination for United States Senate, but lost to Mayor of Pittsburgh Peter Flaherty by less than four points; Flaherty, in turn, lost to incumbent Republican Richard Schweiker. The next year, Denenberg was appointed to the Pennsylvania Public Utilities Commission, but left government soon afterwards.

Soon afterwards, Denenberg began what would be a 24-year long career as a consumer and investigative reporter at Philadelphia's WCAU Channel 10 News. One of his segments was called "Denenberg's Dump" in which he would review products he deemed to be unsafe. He also exposed unsanitary practices by street vendors selling pretzels and hot dogs. During his career, through its time as both a CBS and NBC affiliate, he won 21 Emmy Awards. Aside from television, Denenberg also was a columnist for the Philadelphia Evening Bulletin.

Denenberg died after suffering a heart attack at his home in Wayne, Pennsylvania on March 18, 2010. He was survived by his wife, Naomi. The same year, the Broadcast Pioneers of Philadelphia posthumously inducted Denenberg into their Hall of Fame.

References

External links
 Herb Denenberg's Biography
 Time Magazine Article
 Bad Faith Insurance Article 
 NBC 10's Herb Denenberg Tribute
 Philadelphia Weekly Willdo Column on Herb

1929 births
2010 deaths
20th-century American journalists
American columnists
Jewish American journalists
Lawyers from Philadelphia
American male journalists
American people of Romanian-Jewish descent
American people of Russian-Jewish descent
American television journalists
Consumer rights activists
Creighton University School of Law alumni
Harvard Law School alumni
Insurance underwriters
Johns Hopkins University alumni
Journalists from Nebraska
Journalists from Pennsylvania
United States Army Judge Advocate General's Corps
Pennsylvania Democrats
People from Delaware County, Pennsylvania
Philadelphia television reporters
State cabinet secretaries of Pennsylvania
Temple University faculty
United States Army officers
United States Army reservists
University of Iowa faculty
University of Pennsylvania alumni
Wharton School of the University of Pennsylvania faculty
Writers from Omaha, Nebraska
Jewish American military personnel
20th-century American lawyers
21st-century American Jews
Members of the National Academy of Medicine